Bohemannia nipponicella is a moth of the family Nepticulidae. It was described by Hirano in 2010. It is known from Japan (Honshū).

References

Nepticulidae
Moths of Japan
Moths described in 2010